The women's singles was one of four events of the 1913 World Hard Court Championships tennis tournament held in Paris, France from 7 June until 15 June 1913. The draw consisted of 16 players. Marguerite Broquedis was the title holder and she again reached the final to face Mieken Rieck, a repeat of the previous edition, but this time Rieck was the winner 6–4, 3–6, 6–4.

Draw

Draw

References

Women's Singles
World Hard Court Championships